All About My Wife is a 2012 South Korean romantic comedy film directed by Min Kyu-dong, about a timid husband who hires a professional Casanova to seduce his seemingly perfect but fearsome wife, hoping this will make her divorce him. Starring Im Soo-jung, Lee Sun-kyun and Ryu Seung-ryong, the movie was released in theaters on May 17, 2012.

It is a remake of the Argentinean film Un novio para mi mujer ("A Boyfriend for My Wife").

Plot
After seven years of marriage, the mild-mannered Doo-hyun (Lee Sun-kyun) is at the end of his rope,  Jung-in (Im Soo-jung), his wife is driving him crazy with her endless nagging and complaining.  He can't even bring himself to ask for a divorce because of the fights that will follow. When Doo-hyun's company transfers him out of state, it seems like his dream of getting away is coming true.  But to his horror, Jung-in surprises him by moving across the country to be with him. Desperate but too afraid to ask for a divorce, Doo-hyun recruits his next-door neighbor and legendary Casanova Sung-ki (Ryu Seung-ryong) to seduce his wife and make her leave him first.  After scoping her out, Sung-ki is intrigued by the challenge and confidently agrees to seduce Jung-in as his career finale. Meanwhile, to give her something to do, Doo-hyun has already arranged for Jung-in to get a spot on the local radio station, shooting her mouth off about life's injustices. As times goes on, Sung-ki eventually succeeds in grabbing Jung-in's attention, and the two slowly grow closer. But though Doo-hyun asked for it, he grows to regret his decision and decides to spy on his wife and her lover. He starts to have feeling for his wife again, and does not want to divorce her anymore. But in the meantime Sung-ki falls in love with Jung-in. Doo-hyun asks Sung-ki to stop seducing his wife, but in return the latter threatens that he would disclose to his wife that Doo-hyun recruited him if he comes in-between them. The later part is about who wins Jung-in's heart

Cast

Im Soo-jung - Yeon Jung-in 
Lee Sun-kyun - Lee Doo-hyun 
Ryu Seung-ryong - Jang Sung-ki 
Lee Kwang-soo - PD Choi, radio host 
Kim Ji-young - Song, radio writer
Kim Jung-tae - Park Kwang-shik, Doo-hyun's colleague 
Lee Sung-min - Company Director Na, Doo-hyun's boss
Kim Do-young - Na's wife
Jung Sung-hwa - newspaper delivery man
Lee Dal-hyeong - captain at police station
Park Hee-von - female cop at police station
Jo Han-cheol - public officer at divorce court
Nam Myung-ryul - judge at divorce court
Lee Do-ah - Pyeongchang Company employee
Kim Sun-ha - waitress at noodle shop

Box office
With 594,195 tickets sold during the opening weekend of May 18 to 20, the film's debut made a splash atop the local box office, putting up a strong fight against Hollywood films The Avengers and Men in Black 3. Benefiting from positive word-of-mouth, it continued its impressive commercial run, with over 4.5 million admissions in total.

Awards and nominations

References

External links 
  
  
 
 
 

2012 films
2012 romantic comedy films
South Korean romantic comedy films
South Korean remakes of foreign films
Films set in Japan
Films set in Gangwon Province, South Korea
Next Entertainment World films
2010s Korean-language films
Films directed by Min Kyu-dong
Remakes of Argentine films
2010s South Korean films